Isatu Fofanah (born March 13, 1958) is a Sierra Leonean politician. She is currently serving as the deputy mayor of Makeni, the largest city in Northern Sierra Leone. She is an elected councilor in the Makeni city Council and a member of the All People's Congress political party, the ruling party in Sierra Leone.

References

External links
Allafrica.com
Thepatrioticvanguard.com

Sierra Leonean politicians
21st-century Sierra Leonean women politicians
21st-century Sierra Leonean politicians
People from Bombali District
Living people
1958 births